Lloyd Cowan  (8 July 1962 – 11 January 2021) was a British track and field athlete. Cowan specialised in the 110 and 400 metres hurdles, but was better known as a coach. On 11 January 2021, it was announced that Cowan had died at the age of 58.

Athletics career
Cowan was selected for the 1984 Los Angeles Olympics, but he could not go because of illness. He represented England in the 110 metres hurdles event, at the 1994 Commonwealth Games in Victoria, British Columbia, Canada and won his last medal at the AAA nationals in 1999.

Coaching
He retired from athletics at the age of 39 and went on to coach 18 athletes including; Christine Ohuruogu, the former 400 metres Olympic, World and Commonwealth Champion; Simeon Williamson, the former British 100 metres champion; and Andy Turner, the former European, and Commonwealth 110 metres hurdles champion.

He was appointed MBE in the 2015 Birthday Honours.

References 

1962 births
2021 deaths
People from Essex
Sportspeople from Essex
English athletics coaches
English male hurdlers
Commonwealth Games competitors for England
Athletes (track and field) at the 1994 Commonwealth Games
Members of the Order of the British Empire